Christmas rose is a common name for flowering plants and may refer to:

Helleborus spp., especially Helleborus niger
Hydrangea macrophylla, see Hydrangea